The 2016 German Darts Championship is the tenth of ten PDC European Tour events on the 2016 PDC Pro Tour. The tournament takes place at Halle 39 in Hildesheim, Germany, between 14–16 October 2016. It featured a field of 48 players and £115,000 in prize money, with £25,000 going to the winner.

Michael van Gerwen was the defending champion, but he lost in the third round to Daryl Gurney. Alan Norris won the title, defeating Jelle Klaasen 6–5 in the final, winning him his first PDC European Tour title.

Prize money
The prize money of the European Tour events stays the same as last year.

Qualification and format
The top 16 players from the PDC ProTour Order of Merit on 27 July automatically qualified for the event and were seeded in the second round. The remaining 32 places went to players from three qualifying events - 20 from the UK Qualifier (held in Barnsley on 5 August), eight from the European Qualifier (held on 15 September in Sindelfingen) and four from the Host Nation Qualifier (held on 13 October).

The following players will take part in the tournament:

Top 16
  Michael van Gerwen (third round)
  Peter Wright (third round)
  Dave Chisnall (semi-finals)
  Ian White (third round)
  Kim Huybrechts (third round)
  Michael Smith (second round)
  Benito van de Pas (second round)
  Mensur Suljović (semi-finals)
  Gerwyn Price (second round)
  Jelle Klaasen (runner-up)
  Terry Jenkins (third round)
  Stephen Bunting (second round)
  Alan Norris (winner)
  Simon Whitlock (second round)
  Joe Cullen (quarter-finals)
  Daryl Gurney (quarter-finals)

UK Qualifier
  Mervyn King (first round)
  Mickey Mansell (first round)
  Mark Walsh (first round)
  Justin Pipe (third round)
  Andy Boulton (first round)
  Mark Webster (quarter-finals)
  Kyle Anderson (first round)
  Andy Smith (second round)
  Robbie Green (second round)
  Brendan Dolan (first round)
  Kevin Painter (second round)
  Eddie Dootson (second round)
  Darren Johnson (second round)
  Ted Evetts (second round)
  Steve West (quarter-finals)
  Chris Dobey (first round)
  Scott Taylor (second round)
  David Pallett (third round)
  Peter Hudson (second round)
  Steve Hine (first round)

European Qualifier
  Vincent van der Voort (first round)
  Cristo Reyes (third round)
  Christian Kist (first round)
  Rowby-John Rodriguez (second round)
  Ron Meulenkamp (second round)
  Yordi Meeuwisse (first round)
  Tony West (first round)
  János Végső (first round)
 
Host Nation Qualifier
  Stefan Stoyke (first round)
  Mike Holz (first round)
  Marko Puls (first round)
  Robert Allenstein (second round)

Draw

References

2016
2016 PDC European Tour
2016 in German sport
Sport in Hildesheim